Catalina Thomas Coll Lluch (born 23 April 2001), most commonly known as Cata Coll, is a Spanish professional footballer who plays as a goalkeeper for Liga F club FC Barcelona. In the summer of 2018, at the age of 17, she was one of the captains during the historic triumph of the Spanish U17 team at the World Cup. In the same year, she was a starter for the U20 side at the World Cup in France.

Club career
Cata Coll started her career at Athletic Marratxí, before moving to Collerense.

In July 2019, Coll joined Barcelona on a permanent deal, signing a professional contract until 30 June 2023. She then spent the 2019–20 season on loan at fellow top-tier club Sevilla.

In February 2023, she extended her contract with the Blaugrana club until June 2026.

References

External links
 at Barcelona

2001 births
Living people
Women's association football goalkeepers
Spanish women's footballers
Footballers from Mallorca
UD Collerense (women) players
FC Barcelona Femení players
Sevilla FC (women) players
Primera División (women) players
Spain women's youth international footballers
21st-century Spanish women